Cyclone Fury is a 1951 American Western film directed by Ray Nazarro and starring Charles Starrett.

Production
A late entry in Columbia's long-running Durango Kid Western series, Cyclone Fury has perhaps the  greatest scripting challenge of the series (achieved by writer Barry Shipman). In an effort to save money on production costs and shoot less film in fewer days, Columbia Pictures asked Shipman to economize on his script. Shipman took sequences from four older Durango Kid pictures, plus elements from an old scenario by Ed Earl Repp, and combined them into a new storyline, with Starrett, Smiley Burnette, and villain Clayton Moore appearing in new scenes.

Cast
 Charles Starrett as The Durango Kid / Steve Reynolds
 Fred F. Sears as Capt. Barham
 Clayton Moore as Grat Hanlon
 Robert J. Wilke as Burco ― Henchman (as Bob Wilke)
 Merle Travis as Guitar Player
 Merle Travis' Bronco Busters as Musicians
 Smiley Burnette as Smiley Burnette

References

External links
 
 

1951 films
1950s English-language films
American black-and-white films
Columbia Pictures films
1951 Western (genre) films
American Western (genre) films
Films directed by Ray Nazarro
1950s American films